New fuchsine is an organic compound with the formula [(H2N(CH3)C6H3)3C]Cl.  It is a green-colored solid that is used as a dye of the triarylmethane class.  It is one of the four components of basic fuchsine, and one of the two that are available as single dyes. The other is pararosaniline.  It is prepared by condensation of ortho-toluidine with formaldehyde.  This process initially gives the benzhydrol 4,4'-bis(dimethylamino)benzhydrol, which is further condensed to give the leuco (colorless) tertiary alcohol [(H2N(CH3)C6H3)3COH, which is oxidized in acid to give the dye.

Use as dye and stain
New fuchsine is used to dye polyacrylonitrile, paper, and leather. In biology, it can be used for staining acid-fast organisms, e.g. by Ziehl–Neelsen stain, and for making Schiff's reagent. As a primary amine, the dye can be diazotized in the laboratory, and the resulting diazonium salt used as a trapping agent in enzyme histochemistry.

Etymology
The name fuchsine recognizes Leonhart Fuchs.

See also 

 Fuchsine
 Pararosaniline

References

External links
 New Fuchsin - StainsFile

Triarylmethane dyes
IARC Group 2B carcinogens
Anilines